Bassline (sometimes referred to as bassline house, organ house, Niche,  B-Line, or 4x4) is a music genre related to UK garage that originated in Yorkshire and the Midlands in the early 2000s. Stylistically it comprises a four-to-the-floor rhythm normally at around 135–142 beats per minute and a strong emphasis on bass, similar to that of its precursor speed garage, with chopped up vocal samples and a pop music aesthetic.

In the scene's early days the most prominent bassline club was Niche Nightclub in Sheffield, which became the centre of controversy due to a police raid which resulted in the club's closure in 2005.

Characteristics

Early bassline house
Early bassline shares more similarities with its predecessor speed garage than the style that began to emerge in the latter half of the decade, with many people still referring to bassline house releases from the early 2000s as speed garage. This early style grew from the sound that was popular in nightclubs in Yorkshire and the West Midlands during the late 1990s, which played speed garage mixed with melodic vocal house. While the four-to-the-floor style of speed garage retained popularity in Yorkshire and the Midlands, in London it had declined due to the rise of 2-step garage and grime, which led to Northern and Midlands DJs needing to produce their own records.

A separation between "organ" and "bass" mixes of tracks appeared in the early bassline scene, with "bass" or "B-Line" tracks featuring a "warp" or "reese" synthesized bass line, influenced by speed garage, and "organ" tracks featuring sampled Korg M1-style organ leads, influenced by the house music of the 1990s.

Like most electronic music, sampling played a large role. Many of the same sampled bass lines and drum loops can be heard in old speed garage and bassline house releases, and many popular early releases were bootleg remixes of R&B tracks, or otherwise based on unlicensed vocal samples.

4x4

Towards the end of the 2000s, a new wave of younger Yorkshire-based producers such as TS7, Service Crew, Danny Bond and others, coupled with the rise of digital audio workstations, reduced the use of drum machine samples and old sampled bass lines, which took bassline along a different path. This style started to be called '4x4', moving further away from the original speed garage sound, but still retaining the core elements such as the warping bass and female vocals. In general, bassline as a whole remained fairly underground and was mostly only popular in the North and Midlands, and releases often never went beyond a 12" vinyl EP, or obscure CD mixes or compilations.

Eventually, 4x4 gained popularity on the pop charts, allegedly because it appeals to both genders, while grime and dubstep at the time gathered a predominantly male following. However, a more aggressive style of bassline also developed, which was absent of pitched up female vocals and melodic leads, and was more reminiscent of grime. According to Steve Baxendale, owner of Niche Nightclub, the Niche DJs began to take the vocals out of the speed garage and house music, and thump up the bass. The changes in the style of the music at Niche led to a change from a predominantly white crowd to a predominantly Black British crowd. While the "darker" style of bassline was popular in Sheffield, local scenes in cities such as Birmingham and Leeds continued pursuing a more upbeat style. By 2007, it had become common for people to MC over bassline.

Like dubstep and grime, bassline generally places a strong emphasis on bass, with intricate basslines (often multiple and interweaving) being characteristic of the genre. However, in contrast to these genres, bassline tracks use a four-to-the-floor beat. The music is often purely instrumental, but vocal techniques common in other styles of garage can also be present, such as female R&B vocals sped up to match the faster tempo, and also samples of vocals from grime tracks. Most songs are around 135 to 142 bpm, faster than most UK garage and around the same tempo as most grime and dubstep.

Together with its return to feminine-style music, bassline is said to embrace pop music aesthetics, and to have a euphoric, exuberant quality similar to that of earlier British rave music - both also in contrast to grime and dubstep.

Producer T2 maintains that bassline and UK garage share a common origin in house music but are different sounds, while major bassline distributor and DJ Mystic Matt describes bassline as having a similar rhythm to UK garage, but that the strong emphasis on bass renders it a separate genre.

History

Niche Nightclub

Niche Nightclub was established in 1992 by Steve Baxendale out of an abandoned warehouse on Sheffield's Sidney Street as a club for underground house music and later speed garage. The club was subjected to frequent raids by South Yorkshire Police throughout the 90s and early 2000s. As the bassline scene evolved, and Niche's popularity with it, the name of the club Niche became synonymous with the genre.

In November 2005, the club was stormed by 300 officers in a raid named "Operation Repatriation", and closed, despite a lack of charges against the club's owners. According to Steve Baxendale, Sheffield's police force argued that the club attracted an undesirable clientele and gangs due to heavy drug use inside the club, although it was also argued that the raid was the result of discrimination due the club's increasing popularity with the Black British community in 2005. Sheffield's police force have stated "the only gun crime related to nightlife in Sheffield has been with bassline". However, according to Steve Baxendale, the controversy resulting from Operation Repatriation increased the popularity of the genre.

After Niche's closure, Club Vibe was opened by Steve Baxendale on Sheffield's Charter Row, with an agreement with South Yorkshire Police not to use the name Niche, and DJs restricted to playing classic bassline house and vocal tracks, with a ban on "4x4" productions. High levels of security were eventually relaxed in 2009, and the Vibe premises were expanded and renamed to Niche. After a stabbing occurred outside the club in 2010, a local court forced the club to require membership cards, and the excessive restrictions governing bassline events eventually caused the club's permanent closure.

After repeated attempts by Niche's DJs to re-open the club at its original location on Sidney Street failed due to obstruction by Sheffield City Council and South Yorkshire Police, the original Niche building was scheduled for demolition in 2016.

Emergence into the mainstream
Bassline was an underground scene in the West Midlands  and the north of England until the release of T2's single "Heartbroken" on All Around the World, which attracted international attention, entering the music charts in several countries, including the UK Singles Chart where it reached #2. Grime MC Skepta reported from a tour of several resorts in Greece and Cyprus in summer 2007 that the track was requested in clubs there. Additionally, the track received significant airplay on UK radio stations. Some music critics have said Bassline is more mainstream-friendly than grime, since it appeals more equally to both sexes, whereas grime gathered a predominantly male following.

In December 2007, a reworked version of "Heartbroken", renamed "Jawbroken", created in aid of Ricky Hatton's world title fight against Floyd Mayweather, was selected as warm-up music for the fight.

After T2's success, H "Two" O released their single featuring vocal group Platnum, "What's It Gonna Be" which reached number 7 in the national charts on downloads alone, rising to number 2 the following week, where it remained for the next 3 weeks. Later in the year, one of London's leading bassline producers, Delinquent, signed a deal with All Around The World for another national release, "My Destiny".

Tony Portelli signed the M.I.RAW Recordings single DJ Q (BBC Radio 1Xtra DJ) & MC Bonez to Ministry of Sound to release the single "You Wot!" nationwide for download and sale on 14 July 2008 & 21 July 2008 respectively. The video for the single has received airplay on notable TV music stations such as MTV Base. 23 Deluxe also released their single "Show Me Happiness" which reached number 2 in the BBC Radio 1 Dance Singles Chart. "Daddy O" – a song by Wideboys reached number 32 on the 2008 UK singles chart.

The increased appeal of bassline may be in part due to the vocal contributions of female artists such as Jodie Aysha. The lyrics of bassline are often focused on love and other issues that may be considered more feminine. In a blog posting, Simon Reynolds described the bassline genre as "the drastic pendulum swing from yang to yin, testosterone to oestrogen, that I had always imagined would happen in reaction to grime, except it took so long to happen I gave up on it and just forgot." It has been argued that grime and dubstep originated in turn from "an over-reaction - to the 'feminine pressure' of late-'90s 2-step."

Post mainstream era
After its success through the mid to late 2000s, bassline began to enter a stage of commercial decline. This was mainly driven by the genre not having a presence in nightclubs as it did previously. At this point the genre started to combine elements from older 2-step and UK garage tracks. Artists like 1st Born, Mr Virgo, J69, Freddo, TRC and DJ Q pioneered the new sound which called upon more highly swung beats instead of the classic 4x4 drums that were used in old school bassline tracks. The music at this time was mainly championed by DJ Q via his weekly spot on BBC Radio 1Xtra.

In July 2012, The Independent featured an article about the progress of bassline and the new sound.

With bassline as a scene in decline and nightclub owners still unwilling to carry out events, there was a resurgence in the music as a sound and party culture mainly due to the warehouse and rave culture in the North of England.

Musical commentators observed something of a revival of the genre in 2017, with the increasing popularity of the 'Bassfest' festival and the emergence of new producers pursuing a sub-bass driven style.

Notable bassline record labels 

Boogaloo Records
Ecko Records (Birmingham)
Sub-labels included Low Frequency, Yep Yep Records, Twaron Beats
Gridlok'd Records
Jump Records (Birmingham)
Northern Line Records
Reflective Records (Sheffield)
Sub-labels included Rhythm Traxx and Heavy Records
Studiobeatz (Sheffield)
Sub-labels included Krush Records and Ying Yang Records

See also
List of electronic music genres

Notes

 
UK garage genres
House music genres
English styles of music
Bass (sound)